Harry Shapiro may refer to:

 Harry Shapiro (author), author, journalist and lecturer on the subject of drugs
 Harry Shapiro (criminal) (born 1966), anti-Israeli terrorist
 Harry L. Shapiro (1902–1990), American author, eugenicist, and professor of anthropology

See also
Harold Shapiro (disambiguation)